The six-striped rustic (Xestia sexstrigata) is a moth of the family Noctuidae. It is distributed throughout Europe apart from the far south east.

This is a fairly small species with a wingspan of 36–38 mm. It has pale brown forewings marked with six dark fascia although some of these can be indistinct. The hindwings are pale buff, darker towards the margin.

Technical description and variation

Forewing greyish rufous, the veins dark grey; stigmata with dark outlines; the claviform with the apex only marked; orbicular sometimes paler; lines and shades all dark and distinct; hindwing luteous fuscous, darker towards termen; fringe yellowish.

Biology
The moth flies at night in July and August  and is attracted to light and sugar, as well as the flowers of ragwort.

Larva yellowish brown; dorsal and subdorsal lines pale, the latter black -edged above. The larva feeds on various herbaceous plants including dock, plantain and various grasses. The species overwinters as a larva.

The flight season refers to the British Isles. This may vary in other parts of the range.

References 

Chinery, Michael Collins Guide to the Insects of Britain and Western Europe 1986 (Reprinted 1991)
Skinner, Bernard Colour Identification Guide to Moths of the British Isles 1984

External links
Six-striped rustic at Markku Savela's Lepidoptera pages
Lepiforum
Fauna Europaea

Xestia
Moths described in 1809
Moths of Europe